The Kawanishi J6K1 Jinpu ("Squall") was an interceptor fighter design developed by the Japanese company Kawanishi Kōkūki KK in the early 1940s. It was based on the earlier Kawanishi J3K.

Design and development
The J6K1 was an improved version of the J3K1 with a more powerful engine. Instead of using the Mitsubishi MK9A, it used the Nakajima NK9A Homare 42 engine. The design reached the mockup phase, but not long before the worsening war situation prompted its cancellation in 1944.

Specifications (J6K1 as designed)

See also

References

1940s Japanese fighter aircraft
World War II Japanese fighter aircraft
J6K
Single-engined tractor aircraft
Mid-wing aircraft